This is a discography of the UK garage, R&B and hip hop singer and rapper Ms. Dynamite, twice winner of BRIT Awards and three times winner of MOBO Awards. It contains two studio albums and eight singles.

Albums

Studio albums

Mixtapes

Singles

As lead artist

As featured artist

Other charted songs

Guest appearances

Remixes

Music videos

References

Discographies of British artists